Abarca is a village located in Talca Province, Chile. It's at the south of Tapihue, at the west of Las Ñipas, and north of Los Puercos Creek.

References

Populated places in Talca Province